Dr. Manuel de Jesús Andrade Suárez (17 March 1860 – 1935) was a Colombian writer,  journalist and politician.

A biography has been composed by Rodolfo Pérez Pimentel.

List of works
 Ecuador. Próceres de la independencia; indice alfabetico de sus nombres con algunos bocetos biográficos. 1909
 Páginas de sangre; ó, Los asesinatos de Quito, el 28 de enero de 1912. 1912
 Apostillas geográficas universales: la tierra en 1915, antes de los efectos finales de la Guerra Europea 1915
 Provincia de El Oro; monografías cantonales Machala. Pasaje. Santa Rosa. 1923
 Provincia de El Oro; monografías cantonales Zaruma. 1923
 Más próceres de la independencia, otros complementos y rectificaciones. 1934
 Andanzas de un colombiano. 1935
 Diccionario ortológico, analógico, sintáctico y ortográfico; o, Catálogo de voces castellanas cuyo uso puede ofrecer dificultad, 1935

References

1860 births
1935 deaths
People from Bogotá
Colombian male writers
Colombian journalists
Male journalists
People from Huila Department